Sakhinetipalli is a village and a Mandal head quarter in Konaseema district, Andhra Pradesh, India. The village is one of the three important Ferry points for Sakhinetipalli-Narasapuram. The other two are Kotipalli-Mukteswaram and  Bodasakurru-Pasarlapudi in the Konaseema region.

References 

Mandals in Konaseema district
Mandals in Andhra Pradesh
Villages in Konaseema district